The 1951/52 NTFL season was the 31st season of the Northern Territory Football League (NTFL).

Buffaloes have won there 12th premiership title while defeating the Wanderers Eagles in the grand final by 14 points.

Grand Final

References 

Northern Territory Football League seasons
NTFL